Desmochados is a village in Paraguay, near the northern border of Argentina.

The population is about 250 people. Some nearby larger cities are:
 Corrientes (Argentina) ,
 Resistencia (Argentina) ,
 Pilar (Paraguay).

Sources 																
World Gazeteer: Paraguay – World-Gazetteer.com					

Populated places in the Ñeembucú Department